The Van Herick technique is an eye examination method used to determine the size of the anterior chamber angle of the eye.

Glaucoma is currently the principal cause of irreversible blindness in the world. Therefore, The Van Herick technique is pertinent to the interests of all eye care practitioners as it permits for a quick and simple screening alternative to the conventional Gonioscopy examination. It should not however, be used as a replacement for the gonioscopy examination but rather be used as a means of refuting or confirming the results of a gonioscopy examination.
 
The Van Herick's technique has become the most commonly used qualitative method of assessing the size of the anterior chamber angle (ACA). Whereby, it involves comparing the depth of the peripheral anterior chamber to the thickness of the cornea, when a narrow beam is shone within the limbus at a 60°angle. The anterior chamber drainage angle is then graded as a ratio between the peripheral anterior chamber depth and corneal thickness (AC : C ratio)  or expressed traditionally as a fraction  to provide the Van Herick's result. Grading can also be obtained by distinguishing the structures visible upon observation. Each visible structure correlates to a Van Herick grade which can then be expressed a fraction.

Equipment

 Slit lamp biomicroscope (settings: High rheostat illumination, Medium magnification (10–16×) 2   
 Alcohol swabs: Used to maintain hygiene for the patient

Method
The technique was initially designed by Van Herich, performed with the utilization of a slit lamp without the requirement of any additional aids. It facilitates a simple and quick assessment of the lateral chamber angle. The method involves a narrow slit of light from a slit lamp being projected onto the peripheral cornea at an angle of 60⁰ as near as possible to the limbus. The resulting image is a slit that is projected onto the surface of the cornea, the width is then used as a reference for the grading of the angle. The width of the angle is graded by the distance between the corneal slit image and the slit image on the iris.

Test Requirement
The test should be performed in a dim lit room with the patient directed to fixate on a distance target to minimize any fluctuations of accommodation and pupil size.

Setting up the patient

 Use alcohol wipes to wipe down all surfaces that have been exposed to prior patients, predominately the forehead and chin rest
 Make all necessary adjustments for patient comfort: 
 Adjust chair and slit lamp for correct height
 Align the patient's eye using the chin rest adjuster ensuring that the eye lines up with the alignment marker
 The eyepieces should be focused for the examiner (this can be enabled if the examiner knows their own refractive error and uses the dioptric scale that is found on most slit lamps). Due to proximal accommodation and convergence often a little more minus is required.
 The pupillary distance (pd) should be adjusted for the examiner

Steps

 Adjust the Slit-lamp biomicroscope to the below settings:
 High rheostat illumination
 Medium magnification (10–16×) 2
 Place the illumination system offset at an angle of 60° temporal to the microscope observation system
 Adjust the slit size to the narrowest possible width
 Position the slit beam so that it is perpendicular to the cornea, ensure that the corneal section is as close as possible to the temporal limbus, yet still allowing a clear conception of the gap between the posterior cornea and the projection of the slit beam on to the iris
 Estimate the width of the gap: which accounts for the distance between the anterior chamber depth (ACD) as a fraction (or ratio) of the corneal section thickness, focusing on the central portion of the beam.
 Utilize the Van Herick grading system to record results

Recording and Interpretation

The Van Herick's technique compares the depth of the peripheral anterior chamber with the cornea thickness, usually written as a fraction  however, it can also be expressed as a ratio (see table 3). By grading the angle using the Van Herick technique it also allows an estimation of the probability of closure and an estimated angle in degrees (see table 2).

Evaluation/Limitations
Unfortunately, although the Van Herick offers a quick and simple alternative to gonioscopy examinations, it also comes with limitations to its results. Principally, it has been deduced that measurements performed at the nasal limbus tend to overestimate the angle width. Moreover, although the technique relies on the subjective assessment of the observed structures, it has been found that the results are not easily replicated and there was a high level of variability depending on the perception of the examiner. The technique also may be considered of inadequate scope, as it only provides an estimate of the anterior chamber angle (ACA) at the temporal limbus, in contrast with gonioscopy, which allows for a 360 degree view of the anterior chamber. Furthermore, the Van Herick technique has been found to be exceedingly sensitive to the positioning of the direct slit-lamp beam whereby a 10 degrees deviation from the perpendicular direction was found to be critical to the results and measurements.

In addition, the ACA (anterior chamber angle) ratio was found to be highly dependent on the corneal thickness as a thin cornea would result in a larger ratio than that of a thicker cornea.
 
In conclusion, although the Van Herick technique for anterior chamber angle assessment offers many benefits including being non-invasive, quick, a comparatively accessible technique, with satisfactory specificity and sensitivity values, for the detection of angle closure; it is nonetheless not devoid of limitations. Most of the sources of variability may be simply overcome with the direct measurement of the depth of the anterior chamber through utilisation of equipment such as the Pentacam or imaging digital image analysis, rather than by merely grading the fraction between the anterior chamber depth and the corneal thickness.

References

External links
 Van Herick - A video Demonstration

Diagnostic ophthalmology